Toche may refer to:

Toché (footballer), Spanish footballer
Toche Valley, a valley in Colombia
Toche (Gocho Spanish), a common word particular of the Gocho Spanish (a dialect of Spanish language)